Chinook is a hamlet in southern Alberta, Canada within Special Area No. 3.

Chinook was named after a "warm dry westerly wind from the Rocky Mountains.

Demographics 

Chinook recorded a population of 38 in the 1991 Census of Population conducted by Statistics Canada.

See also 
List of communities in Alberta
List of former urban municipalities in Alberta
List of hamlets in Alberta

References 

Hamlets in Alberta
Former villages in Alberta
Special Area No. 3
Populated places disestablished in 1977